Bhambri is an Indian (Khatri) surname. Notable people with the surname include:

Ankita Bhambri (born 1986), former Indian tennis player, sister of Sanaa and Yuki, cousin of Prerna
Prerna Bhambri (born 1992), Indian tennis player, cousin of Ankita, Sanaa and Yuki
Sanaa Bhambri (born 1988), former Indian tennis player, sister of Ankita and Yuki, cousin of Prerna
Yuki Bhambri (born 1992), Indian tennis player, brother of Ankita and Sanaa, cousin of Prerna

Indian surnames
Surnames of Indian origin
Punjabi-language surnames
Hindu surnames
Khatri clans
Khatri surnames